Raymond Lemarié (19 June 1913 – 18 December 1997) was a French racing cyclist. He rode in the 1937 Tour de France.

References

1913 births
1997 deaths
French male cyclists
Place of birth missing